The 2016 Milo Open Cali was a professional tennis tournament played on clay courts. It was the ninth edition of the tournament, which is part of the 2016 ATP Challenger Tour. It took place in Cali, Colombia between 4 and 10 July 2016.

Singles main-draw entrants

Seeds

1 Rankings as of June 27, 2016.

Other entrants
The following players received wildcards into 
  Giovanni Lapentti
  Felipe Mantilla
  Nicolás Mejía
  Cristian Rodríguez

The following player entered the singles main draw with a protected ranking:
  Carlos Salamanca

The following players received entry from the qualifying draw:
  Marcelo Tomás Barrios Vera
  Juan Sebastián Gómez
  Nicolás Jarry
  Roberto Quiroz

Doubles main-draw entrants

Seeds

1 Rankings as of June 27, 2016.

Other entrants 
The following pairs received wildcards into the singles main draw:
 José Daniel Bendeck /  Nicolás Mejía
 Alejandro Gómez /  Felipe Mantilla
 Juan Sebastián Gómez /  Cristian Rodríguez

Champions

Singles

  Darian King def.  Víctor Estrella Burgos, 5–7, 6–4, 7–5

Doubles

  Nicolás Jarry /  Hans Podlipnik def.  Erik Crepaldi /  Daniel Dutra da Silva, 6–1, 7–6(8–6)

External links
Official Website

Milo Open Cali
Seguros Bolívar Open Cali
2016 in Colombian tennis